Chia-Wei Woo , was the founding president of the Hong Kong University of Science and Technology. His work included raising funding and recruiting outstanding faculty for the university. With Chung Sze Yuen, Woo created an institution, including a top ranked Business School, known as the HKUST Business School. The school's MBA, EMBA and Executive Education programs have been consistently ranked as Asia's top programs, and in the World Top 50 MBA programs by the Financial Times of London.<ref>[http://www.bm.ust.hk/mba Financial Times of London ratings]</ref> Woo retired in 2001 after 13 years of service and remains President Emeritus as well as University Professor Emeritus.

Education and academia
Born in Shanghai in 1937, he received his secondary education from Pui Ching Middle School in Hong Kong and went to the US in 1955, where he acquired his BS degree in Physics/Mathematics at Georgetown College in Kentucky, and his MA degree in Physics at Washington University in St. Louis. He went on to pursue his PhD at Washington University in St. Louis under Eugene Feenberg. Later, he taught at Northwestern University and at the University of Illinois, served as Northwestern's chairman, Physics and Astronomy Department, then as Provost, Revelle College, U.C. San Diego (where he had pursued post-doctoral work). In 1983, at the age of 45, he became president of San Francisco State University, the first Chinese American to head a major university in the United States.

Since 1964, Woo has published 120 papers and books in various fields of physics, particularly in quantum many-body theory, statistical mechanics, liquid crystals, low temperature physics, and surface physics.

Honors and awards
Woo has received many honours and awards for professional achievement and civic contribution, including Fellowships of the American Physical Society and the California Academy of Sciences; the Alfred P. Sloan Research Fellowship; Honorary Professorships at Fudan University, Chinese Academy of Sciences (Institute of Physics), Shenzhen University, and Peking University; the Eleanor Roosevelt Humanitarian Award by the United Nations Association; the Golden Key of the City of San Francisco; Chia-Wei Woo Day'' was declared by the Mayor of San Francisco. 

He was National President of the National Association of Chinese-Americans during 1984–86. He was the US China Olympics Liaison for the 1984 Summer Olympics, held in Los Angeles. In 1991, he received a Distinguished Alumnus Award from his alma mater, Washington University.

Honours
In 1995, he received an honorary Doctor of Letters degree from Georgetown College, and was named an Honorary Citizen by the Municipal Government of Shenzhen. In 1996, he received a Distinguished International Service Award from the University of Minnesota and an honorary Doctor of Science degree from Washington University; and was appointed a Commander of the Most Excellent Order of the British Empire (CBE) by Queen Elizabeth II. In 2000, he was awarded the Gold Bauhinia Star by the Government of the Hong Kong Special Administrative Region (HKSAR). In 2001, he was awarded "Chevalier de la Légion d'Honneur" by the President of the Republic of France.

Political career
He has served on Hong Kong Government's Industry and Technology Development Council and the Board of Overseers for the Institutes of Biotechnology, and was appointed by the Municipal Government of Shenzhen as Senior Advisor. He served on governing and advisory boards of the Business and Professionals Federation of Hong Kong, the Shanghai-Hong Kong Council for the Promotion and Development of Yangtze, the National Natural Science Foundation of China, Fudan University, Hua Qiao University, Zhongguancun Science Park (Advisory Committee), Ghulam Ishaq Khan Institute of Engineering Sciences and Technology (Pakistan), World Scientific Publishing Company (Singapore), and China Europe International Business School. 

From 1993–96, he was appointed by the Chinese government, first as a Hong Kong Affairs Advisor, then a Member of the Preliminary Working Committee, and then a Member of the Preparatory Committee, and was elected to the Selection Committee for HKSAR. He was appointed in 1998 to the Commission on Strategic Development of HKSAR and the Chinese People's Political Consultative Conference. In 2000, he was appointed to the Council of Advisors on Innovation and Technology of HKSAR, and as Chairman of the Committee on Hong Kong – Mainland Technological Collaboration. He has spoken multiple times at the World Economic Forum in Davos, Switzerland.

References

1937 births
Living people
21st-century American physicists
Chinese emigrants to the United States
Hong Kong educators
Hong Kong scientists
Writers from Shanghai
Presidents of the Hong Kong University of Science and Technology
Northwestern University faculty
Presidents of San Francisco State University
University of California, San Diego faculty
University of Illinois faculty
Washington University in St. Louis alumni
Washington University physicists
Georgetown College (Kentucky) alumni
Politicians from Shanghai
Recipients of the Gold Bauhinia Star
Commanders of the Order of the British Empire
Scientists from Shanghai
Members of the Preparatory Committee for the Hong Kong Special Administrative Region
Members of the Selection Committee of Hong Kong
Hong Kong Affairs Advisors
Educators from Shanghai
Fellows of the American Physical Society